Anita Protti (born 4 August 1964) is a Swiss former athlete who competed mainly in the 400 metres hurdles. She won the silver medal in the 400m hurdles at the 1990 European Championships, and bronze medals in the 400 metres at the 1989 European Indoor Championships and 1991 World Indoor Championships. Her 400m hurdles best of 54.25 secs has stood as the Swiss record since 1991.

Career
Born in Lausanne, Protti specialised in the 400 metres hurdles. Her greatest career achievement was when she won the silver medal at the 1990 European Championships in Athletics.

Protti missed most of the 1992 and 1993 seasons because of an achilles injury.

International competitions

Personal bests 
 400 metres hurdles: 54.25 s (1991), Swiss record
 400 metres: 51.32 s (1990), Swiss record (1990–2017)
 800 metres: 1.59.98 min (1990)

References

External links

1964 births
Living people
Swiss female hurdlers
Athletes (track and field) at the 1988 Summer Olympics
Olympic athletes of Switzerland
European Athletics Championships medalists
Sportspeople from Lausanne
World Athletics Indoor Championships medalists